Cista Provo is a municipality in Croatia in the Split-Dalmatia County. Around Cista Provo, there are a few villages, including Olujići, Dumancici, and Kasumi.

Population
According to the most recent 2011 census Cista Provo municipality had a total population of 2,377 in six settlements:

Aržano (478)
Biorine (181)
Cista Provo (469)
Cista Velika (616)
Dobranje (161)
Svib (430)

References

Populated places in Split-Dalmatia County
Municipalities of Croatia